Standard Deviants is a series of educational videos produced in the United States dealing with educational subjects such as math, science, automobile repair, politics, English, social studies, foreign language, and SAT Test Prep created for elementary schoolers, middle schoolers, high schoolers, college students, and graduate school students in the U.S. Originally a Public Broadcasting Service (PBS) public television series, it blends essential information with Saturday Night Live-style humor. It is now a division of Cerebellum Corporation. The show is divided into many sections, using a humorous entrance to each one. An example of this is a hilarious Spanish side-plot using sticky spots on a kitchen floor to introduce definite and indefinite articles.

The Standard Deviants brand has two different branches: Standard Deviants for home use and Standard Deviants School for school or public use. Standard Deviants School products are accompanied by Public Performance Rights.

The Standard Deviants

Hosts

Brad Aldous
Gelila Asres
Jonnie Bess
Mike Birbiglia
Herschel Bleefeld
Andy Campbell
Strawberry Catubo
Peggy Chang
Ashley Fleming
Tim Gore
Lara D. Hopewell (who is also an executive producer for the show)

Krisjana Knight
Chaz Mastin
T.J. Miller
Chris Noll (AKA Chris Wylde)
Tessa Munro
Shaun Powell
Kenyatta Rogers
Stephen Siddell
Ptolemy Slocum
Kerry Washington
and their Golden Retriever Hoss

Directors
Christopher Fetner
Robert Deege
Joseph Doria
Alpesh Patel
Jon Reich
Sam Genovese
Aldo Bello
Danielle Fenati

Subjects

Science

 Anatomy
 Astronomy
 Biology
 Chemistry
 Dinosaurs
 Geology
 Nutrition and cooking
 Organic Chemistry
 Physics

Math

 Basic Math
 Pre-Algebra
 Algebra
 Geometry
 Trigonometry
 Pre-Calculus
 Calculus
 Differential Equations
 Statistics
 Pre-School

Language
English
 Composition
 Grammar
 Punctuation
 Fantasy Literature
 As a Second Language

French
Italian
Spanish

Literature
Shakespeare
Origins & Style
Macbeth, Othello, and King Lear
Romeo & Juliet, Hamlet, and Titus Andronicus
The Lord of the Rings

Social Studies

 American Government
 American History
 Psychology
 Sociology
 World Geography

Business 

 Accounting
 Business Law
 Economics
 Finance
 Marketing
 Job hunting

Miscellaneous 

 Internet
 SAT
 Automobile Repair
 Wine Selection & Tasting
 Jungle Survival

External links 
The Standard Deviants: Home
PBS site

PBS original programming
American children's education television series
1990s American children's television series
2000s American children's television series